Larry Boelens (September 12, 1942 – August 23, 1988) was an American television lighting consultant, gaffer, electrician, second unit photographer, and director of photography. He worked in several capacities on some noted television sitcoms, among them Soap, as well as on episodes of the original WKRP in Cincinnati, one of them being the famous Turkeys Away episode, for which he was the lighting consultant. He was also lighting consultant on the two-part pilot episode for the series.  He also worked on the children's Saturday morning series The Bugaloos.  He served as gaffer on the films Let's Do It Again (1975) and Sheila Levine Is Dead and Living in New York (1975), and as lighting director for the program 20 Minute Workout.  His most notable work, however, may have been as director of photography for the 1977 television production of Tchaikovsky's Christmas ballet The Nutcracker starring Mikhail Baryshnikov, a now-classic interpretation of the work that has become a television, VHS, and DVD favorite. He was also director of photography on Cindy, a 1978 all-black modern retelling of "Cinderella", and on several episodes of Bosom Buddies, the sitcom that introduced Tom Hanks to television audiences.

Boelens died at the age of 45 in 1988, the same year that he served as second unit photographer on the John Hughes comedy She's Having a Baby.

Though Boelens himself was never nominated for an Emmy Award, several of the television programs on which he worked were, including Soap, WRKP in Cincinnati, the Baryshnikov Nutcracker, and Cindy.

(See also the articles The Nutcracker, Mikhail Baryshnikov, and Soap.)

References

1942 births
1988 deaths
American cinematographers